George Arthur Sheltz (April 20, 1946 – December 21, 2021) was an American prelate of the Roman Catholic Church.  

Sheltz served as an auxiliary bishop of the Archdiocese of Galveston-Houston in Texas from 2012 to 2021.

Biography

Early life
Sheltz was born April 20, 1946, in Houston, Texas to George and Margaret Sheltz. He attended Annunciation Catholic School and St. Thomas High School, both in Houston. 

While in high school, Sheltz decided to enter the priesthood.  After graduation, he entered St. Mary's Seminary and the University of St. Thomas, graduating in 1971 with a Bachelor of Arts in philosophy and a Master's in Theology.

Priesthood
On May 15, 1971, Sheltz was ordained to the priesthood for the Archdiocese of Houston-Galveston by Bishop John Louis Morkovsky.

After his ordination, Sheltz performed pastoral duties in five Houston parishes: Assumption, Sacred Heart Co-Cathedral; St. Vincent de Paul,  Christ the Redeemer, and Prince of Peace. He also served at St. Anthony of Padua Parish in Woodlands, Texas. 

While working in the parish, Sheltz also served as Dean of the San Jacinto Deanery and Episcopal Vicar of the Northern Vicariate. 

In 2000, Pope John Paul II named Sheltz a prelate of honor, with the title of Monsignor. In 2007, Sheltz was named Secretariat Director for Clergy Formation and Chaplaincy Services. In 2010, he was named vicar general, chancellor and moderator of the curia for the Archdiocese.

Auxiliary Bishop of Galveston-Houston
On February 21, 2012, Pope Benedict XVI appointed Sheltz as Titular Bishop of Hirina and Auxiliary Bishop of the Archdiocese of Galveston-Houston. He was installed and consecrated at the Co-Cathedral of the Sacred Heart in Houston by Cardinal Daniel DiNardo on May 2, 2012. He served as Auxiliary Bishop until his retirement on June 22, 2021.

In June 2019, an anonymous woman alleged in a letter to the Archdiocese that Sheltz had sexually abused her in 1971.  The author threatened to make the charge public unless the transfer of her parish priest, Hai Dang, was reversed. The allegation was investigated by the Congregation for the Doctrine of the Faith in Rome, which determined that they were totally baseless.

Personal life and death
Sheltz died on December 21, 2021, at the age of 75.

See also
 

Roman Catholic Archdiocese of Galveston-Houston
 Catholic Church hierarchy
 Catholic Church in the United States
 Historical list of the Catholic bishops of the United States
 List of Catholic bishops of the United States
 Lists of patriarchs, archbishops, and bishops

References

External links
Roman Catholic Archdiocese of Galveston–Houston Official Site
Catholic-Hierarchy

Episcopal succession

1946 births
2021 deaths
Bishops
Clergy from Houston